The Short Parliament was a Parliament of England that was summoned by King Charles I of England on the 20th of February 1640 and sat from 13th of April to the 5th of May 1640. It was so called because of its short life of only three weeks.

After 11 years of attempting Personal Rule between 1629 and 1640, Charles recalled Parliament in 1640 on the advice of Lord Wentworth, recently created Earl of Strafford,  primarily to obtain money to finance his military struggle with Scotland in the Bishops' Wars. However, like its predecessors, the new parliament had more interest in redressing perceived grievances occasioned by the royal administration than in voting the King funds to pursue his war against the Scottish Covenanters.

John Pym, MP for Tavistock, quickly emerged as a major figure in debate; his long speech on 17 April expressed the refusal of the House of Commons to vote subsidies unless royal abuses were addressed. John Hampden, in contrast, was persuasive in private: he sat on nine committees. A flood of petitions concerning royal abuses were coming up to Parliament from the country. Charles's attempted offer to cease the levying of ship money did not impress the House.

Annoyed with the resumption of debate on Crown privilege and the violation of Parliamentary privilege by the arrest of the nine members in 1629, and unnerved about an upcoming scheduled debate on the deteriorating situation in Scotland, Charles dissolved Parliament on 5 May 1640, after only three weeks' sitting. It was followed later in the year by the Long Parliament.

See also
List of MPs elected to the English parliament in 1640 (April)
List of parliaments of England

References

David Plant, "The Short Parliament"  
"John Hampden in the Short Parliament"

1640 in England
Parliaments of Charles I of England
1640 in politics